Róger Gómez Tenorio (born February 7, 1965) is a retired Costa Rican football player.

Club career
Born in Palmar Sur, Gómez played for Municipal Osa, Cartaginés and Herediano and scored 119 league goals during his career, 38 of them for Herediano. He was dismissed by Herediano in November 1995 after a poor season.

He played a total of 524 matches in the Costa Rican Primera División from 1986 through 2002.

International career
Nicknamed El Policía, he made his debut for Costa Rica in a May 1990 friendly match against Poland and earned a total of 19 caps, scoring 4 goals. He was part of the national team, that played in the 1990 FIFA World Cup held in Italy, and featured in three of their four games played. He scored the first goal in the UNCAF Nations Cup history in 1991, and also played at the 1991 CONCACAF Gold Cup.

He played his final international on 8 November 1992 against Honduras.

International goals
Scores and results list Costa Rica's goal tally first.

Managerial career
After retiring as a player, Gómez became a manager and was in charge of several local sides like Osa as well as of Panamanian side Atlético Veragüense.

References

External links

1965 births
Living people
People from Puntarenas Province
Association football midfielders
Costa Rican footballers
Costa Rica international footballers
1990 FIFA World Cup players
1991 CONCACAF Gold Cup players
C.S. Herediano footballers
C.S. Cartaginés players
Municipal Pérez Zeledón footballers
Costa Rican football managers
Copa Centroamericana-winning players